Curtis Donnell Davis (August 7, 1968 – June 15, 2002), better known by his stage name Big Mello, was an American rapper from Houston, Texas.

Mello graduated from Madison High School, and in the early 1980s, he attended Texas Southern University, studying music and broadcasting. Mello would go on to sign to J. Prince's  Rap-A-Lot Records label and debuted in 1992 with the album "Bone Hard Zaggin" and then in 1994 whith "Wegonefunkwichamind."

Shea Serrano of the Houston Press said that Big Mello was famous for "repping Hiram Clarke in the 90s[...]"

On June 15, 2002, Davis along with a passenger died after Davis lost control of his vehicle and hit a pillar in the 4500 block of South Loop West (South Interstate Highway 610).

Discography
 1992: Bone Hard Zaggin' 
 1994: Wegonefunkwichamind
 1996: Southside Story
 2002: The Gift 
 2003: Done Deal

See also

Houston hip hop

References

1968 births
2002 deaths
African-American male rappers
American male rappers
Gangsta rappers
G-funk artists
Rappers from Houston
Road incident deaths in Texas
Screwed Up Click members
Southern hip hop musicians
Underground rappers
20th-century American male musicians
20th-century African-American musicians
21st-century African-American people